The Fantastic Baggys were an American surf and hot rod group, created by P.F. Sloan and Steve Barri.  The studio group released several unsuccessful singles.  They released one album internationally, Tell 'Em I'm Surfin'  (1964) on Imperial Records, and several singles and albums only in South Africa, where they proved to be briefly popular.

They provided Jan and Dean with several songs to record, including "Summer Means Fun" and "From All over The World".

Discography

Singles
 "Move Out, Little Mustang" b/w "Bucket Seats" (Imperial 66036) - as the Rally-Packs; audition record
 "Tell 'Em I'm Surfin'" b/w "A Surfer Boy's Dream" (Imperial 66047)
 "Anywhere the Girls Are" b/w "Debbie Be True" (Imperial 66072)
 "It Was I" / "Alone on the Beach" (Imperial 66092)

Singles (backing other musicians)
 Shelley Fabares "I Know You'll Be There" b/w "Lost Summer Love" (Vee-Jay VJ 632) - The Fantastic Baggys play (uncredited) backing on Side One
 Jan & Dean "The Little Old Lady from Pasadena" b/w "My Mighty G.T.O" (Liberty 55704)
 Jan & Dean  "Ride The Wild Surf" b/w "The Anaheim, Azusa & Cucamonga Sewing Circle, Book Review And Timing Association" (Liberty 55724)

Albums
 Tell 'Em I'm Surfin'  (Imperial 12270, Mono, 1964)
 Tell 'Em I'm Surfin'
 Let's Make the Most of Summer
 Surfin' Craze
 Big Gun Board
 Alone on the Beach
 This Little Woody
 Surfer Boy's Dream Come True
 When Surfers Rule
 Wax Up Your Board
 Summer Means Fun
 Surfin's Back Again
 Surf Impersonations
 Tell 'Em I'm Surfin'  (Liberty 10192, 1982)
 Tell 'Em I'm Surfin'
 Surfer Boy's Dream Come True
 Summer Means Fun
 Wax Up Your Board
 Let's Make the Most of Summer
 Surfin' Craze
 This Little Woody
 Big Gun Board
 When Surfers Rule
 Surfin's Back Again
 Surfin' Craze (Edsel 118, 1986)
 Tell 'Em I'm Surfin'
 Surfin' Craze
 Let's Make the Most of Summer
 Anywhere the Girls Are
 Big Gun Board
 Alone on the Beach
 Debbie Be True
 This Little Woody
 When Surfers Rule
 Surfer Boy's Dream Come True
 It Was I
 Wax Up Your Board
 Summer Means Fun
 Surfin's Back Again
 Surfer Impersonations

Compilation albums
 The Best of the Fantastic Baggys: Tell 'Em I'm Surfin''' (Capitol, 1992)
 Tell 'Em I'm Surfin'
 Let's Make the Most of Summer
 Surfin' Craze
 Big Gun Board
 Alone on the Beach
 This Little Woody
 A Surfer Boy's Dream Come True
 When Surfers Rule
 Wax Up Your Board
 Summer Means Fun
 Surfin's Back Again / Surf Impersonations
 Move Out, Little Mustang
 Save Your Sundays for Surfin'
 Horace, the Swingin' School Bus Driver
 Hot Rod U.S.A.
 Debbie Be True
 Anywhere the Girls Are
 My Heart Is an Open Book
 This Little Woody [Version 2]
 It Was I
 (Goes to Show) Just How Wrong You Can Be
 Anywhere the Girls Are!: The Best of the Fantastic Baggys'' (Sundazed, 2000)
 Surfin' Craze
 Save Your Sundays for Surfin'
 Debbie Be True
 Anywhere the Girls Are
 Tell 'Em I'm Surfin'
 This Little Woody
 Wax up Your Board
 Surfer Boy's Dream Come True
 Big Gun Board
 Let's Make the Most of the Summer 
 Summer Means Fun
 Hot Rod U.S.A.
 Alone on the Beach
 It Was I
 When Surfers Rule
 Surfin's Back Again
 Move Out, Little Mustang
 My Heart Is an Open Book
 (Goes to Show) Just How Wrong You Can Be
 Horace, the Swingin' School Bus Driver [Instrumental Track]
 This Little Woody [Alternate Version]
 Save Your Sundays for Surfin' [Instrumental Track]
 Alone on the Beach [Instrumental]
 Big Gun Board [Vocal Track]
 It Was I [Vocal Overdub 1]
 When Surfers Rule [Instrumental]
 Surfer Boy's Dream Come True [Background Vocal Overdub 1]
 Let's Make the Most of the Summer [Instrumental]

References

Surf music groups
Imperial Records artists